Sally Patricia Oldfield (born 3 August 1947) is an Irish singer-songwriter. She is the sister of composers Mike and Terry Oldfield.

Early life
Born in Dublin, Ireland, Oldfield was raised in the Roman Catholic faith of her mother, Maureen. Spending her childhood in Reading, Berkshire, Oldfield studied ballet from the age of four and won numerous competitions in all styles of dance, including ballet, tap and modern. At the age of eleven, she won a scholarship to the Royal Academy of Dancing, then located in Holland Park, London, and two years later was starred to move on to the Royal Ballet School at White Lodge. However, she gave up ballet two years later, and achieved three A-Levels at Grade A. She studied classical piano to Grade 7. All her school years were spent at St Joseph's Convent School, Reading, where she became friends with Marianne Faithfull. Oldfield read English Literature and Philosophy at Bristol University.

Musical career
Oldfield's musical career started in early 1968, when she made some demo recordings with her younger brother Mike Oldfield. These sessions were suggested and overseen by Mick Jagger. It is not known what became of those recordings.

Soon after this she founded the folk music duo The Sallyangie together with her brother Mike. The duo was signed to Transatlantic Records and recorded their only album at the recommendation of Pentangle band guitarist, John Renbourn, whom Oldfield met at the Troubadour Folk Club in Bristol. The album Children of the Sun was recorded in August 1968. The songs on it are mainly co-written by Sally and Mike Oldfield, and the album contained some of her brother's early guitar work. Guesting were Terry Cox on drums and Ray Warleigh on flute.

Oldfield's first mainstream recorded release was by a Finnish bass player named Pekka Pohjola. This album was mainly recorded at her brother's studio Througham Slad, Gloucestershire, between 22 November – 5 December 1976 and was originally released in 1977 as Keesojen Lehto by Pekka Pohjola. Later different labels translated the titles and changed the artist's name due to the name recognition of Mike and Sally Oldfield.

Oldfield's debut solo album, Water Bearer, was released in 1978. Her song, "Mirrors", was on the album. It peaked at No. 19 in the UK Singles Chart, spanning 1978 and 1979, and remained in that chart for thirteen weeks. The song also peaked at number 88 in Australia.

Since then, she has released fifteen solo albums.

On the demise of her record label Bronze Records in 1984, Oldfield relocated to Germany and based her musical career there. Most of her albums from 1983 onwards were not released in the UK. She worked with many German record producers and musicians, including Gunther Mende and Candy DeRouge. Oldfield regularly appeared on national television and radio, and undertook several European concert tours, the last being in Germany in 2003.

Guest appearances
Oldfield provided background vocals in sections of brother Mike's 1970s albums Tubular Bells, Ommadawn and Incantations.  She reprised her role on Tr3s Lunas in 2002 and for the 2003 re-recording, Tubular Bells 2003.  In addition, she worked on her other brother Terry's recordings. She sang "Shadow of the Hierophant" on Steve Hackett's 1975 album, Voyage of the Acolyte. On her 1988 CD album "Instincts", released by CBS Records UK, she did a vocal duet with Justin Hayward of The Moody Blues, titled "Let It Begin", which was a hit in the UK and Europe, and was a popular music video.

Discography

Solo
1978 – Water Bearer – AUS No. 94 
1979 – Easy 
1980 – Celebration 
1981 – Playing in the Flame 
1982 – In Concert 
1983 – Strange Day in Berlin 
1987 – Femme 
1988 – Instincts 
1990 – Natasha 
1992 – The Flame as 'Natasha Oldfield'
1994 – Three Rings 
1996 – Secret Songs 
2001 – Flaming Star 
2009 – Cantadora 
2012 – Arrows of Desire
2018 – The Enchanted Way
2019 – Mystique

With Steve Hackett
1975 – Voyage of the Acolyte

With Mike Oldfield
1973 – Tubular Bells 
1974 – Hergest Ridge 
1975 – Ommadawn 
1978 – Incantations 
2002 – Tres Lunas 
2003 – Tubular Bells 2003

With Pekka Pohjola
1977 – The Mathematician's Air Display

References

External links
 
 Sally Oldfield on MySpace

1947 births
Living people
People from Reading, Berkshire
English folk singers
People educated at St Joseph's Convent School
Bronze Records artists